The Tomás Frías Autonomous University (Universidad Autónoma Tomás Frías or UATF) is a public university located in Potosí, Bolivia. It was established in 1892.

History 

Officially created by Supreme Decree of October 15, 1892, which in the first Article states.
University Districts of Potosi and Oruro are erected.
"Se erigen los distritos Universitarios de Potosí y Oruro"

It began operating from the Free Faculty of Law in 1876, subordinated to Cancelariato of Chuquisaca.

On November 30, 1892, is issued a Regulatory decree by which provides that the departments of Potosí and Oruro are independent of cancelariatos of Chuquisaca and La Paz respectively, and while the law does not give more space to university councils, are restricted to their Faculties of Law.

On February 3, 1893, the University Council of Potosi was installed, under the leadership of chancellor and president Dr. Nicanor Careaga.

Officially in October 1937, it recognizes the autonomy to the university district of Potosi, the first Autonomist Rector was Dr. Alberto Saavedra Nogales.

By Act of November 29, 1924 (enacted on December 2, 1924) by the President of the Republic of Bolivia  Dr. Bautista Saavedra Mallea,  Potosí University bears the name of eminent intellectual born in Potosí, Dr. Tomás Frías Ametller, recognizing their contribution to the organization of the Bolivian University.

Currently Tomás Frías Autonomous University is one of the 15 universities Recognized by CEUB (Executive Committee of Bolivian Universities), the maximum authority in the Bolivian University.

It has twelve Faculties with 42 Schools.

Campus

The Central Campus of the Tomás Frías Autonomous University  is located at "El Maestro" Avuenue - "Cívica" Avenue, is home for many of the Faculties, other Faculties and the School of Medicine have own buildings distributed in the central area of the Potosi city, currently is under construction a University Citadel that will work with different faculties.

The citadel will be a modern building complex comprising five blocks properly equipped.
The perimeter on which is seated, reaches 80 thousand square meters, is currently running the facility for lithium carbonate production "Technikum", which is dependent of the Tomás Frías Autonomous University and Freiberg University of Mining and Technology.

Colleges
The university has the following colleges
 Faculty of Arts
 Faculty of Agricultural and Animal Sciences
 Faculty of Economics, Finance and Administration
 Faculty of Pure Sciences
 Faculty of Humanities and Social Sciences
 Faculty of Law
 Faculty of Engineering
 Faculty of Geology
 Faculty of Mining Engineering
 Faculty of Technology
 Faculty of Health Sciences
 Faculty of Medicine

Research
 Technikum lithium carbonate production facility
 Bolivian Institute for High Altitude Biology
 Mining Environmental Research Center (CIMA project)

Notable alumni
Florencio Ruck Pozadas Cordero, Musician, percussionist and composer
Carlos Medinaceli, Writer and literary critic

References

External links
  The Official Website of Tomás Frías Autonomous University (Spanish)
 Tomás Frías Autonomous University Brochure (Spanish)
 Tomás Frías University School of Medicine (Spanish)
 Executive Committee of Bolivian Universities (Spanish)

Universities in Bolivia
Educational institutions established in 1892
Buildings and structures in Potosí Department
Education in Potosí Department
1892 establishments in Bolivia